FAMACHA (FAffa MAlan CHArt) is a selective treatment method for controlling the level of parasitic barber's pole worm (Haemonchus contortus, also known as twisted wireworm) among domesticated small ruminant populations. In contrast with earlier, more aggressive approaches, under FAMACHA only certain sheep or goats in a flock are selected for treatment. Selection for treatment is based on the degree of anaemia the animals are displaying in their mucous membranes, which is assessed through a colour guided chart.

Background 
The FAMACHA method of selective treatment was developed by three South African researchers (Drs Francois Malan, Gareth Bath and Jan van Wyk) against the backdrop of major anthelmintic resistance in South Africa. However, the method has since been implemented successfully in various locations around the world.

The aim of the method is to maintain a sufficient susceptible H. contortus worm population (‘refugia’) on the pasture. By only dosing those sheep in critical need of treatment, selection for worms resistant against treatment is retarded, while at the same time the farmer can monitor and cull those sheep with a poor natural resistance against these worms.

Procedure 

Anaemia (as observed in the mucous membrane of the eye) is assessed via a colour guided chart: a sheep with a score of 1 having a pink-red mucous membrane colour and not requiring treatment for haemonchosis; whereas a sheep with a score of 5 has white mucous membranes, requiring immediate dosing for haemonchosis and probably intensive medical treatment.

References

External links
FAMACHA System - American Consortium for Small Ruminant Parasite Control (ACSRPC)

Veterinary helminthology